Dmytro Lvovych Klebanov (– 6 June 1987) was a Soviet-era Ukrainian composer. He studied at the Kharkov Music and Drama Institute (graduated 1926) with S. Bogatyryov. He taught at the Kharkov Conservatory (professor, 1960). Among his students were Valentin Bibik, Vitaliy Hubarenko, and Viktor Suslin.

Klebanov studied music academically as a pianist, violist, conductor, and composer, and became a professor of composition at the Kharkov Conservatory. In the late 1930s and early 1940s a couple of ballets, a violin concerto, and a symphony received major performances in Moscow and Kiev. Unfortunately, the first symphony "In Memoriam to the Martyrs of Babi Yar" (1945) fell afoul of Stalinist critics who found it anti-patriotic. Being accused of distortion of the historic truth about the Soviet people and of national narrow-mindedness it was exiled for a life in archives. Stalin made his infamous attack on Soviet artists (Zhdanov Doctrine). The Soviet Composers' Union adopted the unwritten rule that one composer would be selected to take the heat for all of them—Klebanov was it. Although Klebanov was spared exile to Siberia, or worse, he was relegated to an obscure existence and spent most of this period composing politically correct works of "socialist realism" with titles like Ode for the Party and "First of May" Symphony. Following thirty years in de facto exile, Klebanov was rehabilitated in the 1980s.

In 1983, Mela Tenenbaum (violinist/violist) was in Kharkov to play a viola concerto written for her by a pupil of Klebanov, whom she met after the concert. Klebanov suggested Tenenbaum perform his own Violin Concerto, and after the success of that venture the following season, he wrote a viola concerto expressly for her. This work had a positive reception in several Russian cities and Klebanov found his long stifled creative energies reviving. Another new work followed, Japanese Silhouettes for soprano, viola d'amore and instrumental ensemble, based on haiku texts translated into Russian. This work was recorded for Radio Kiev with soprano Natalia Kraftzova, and a "rehabilitation" of Klebanov seemed imminent. But the composer died in 1987, just short of his 80th birthday, and soon artistic chaos engulfed the disintegrating Soviet Union. His music disappeared and was thought to have been lost in a fire and flood which destroyed the Musical Foundation building where his scores were kept.

Selected works 
Opera
 By One Life (Единой жизнью) (1947)
 Vasily Gubanov (Василий Губанов) (1966)
 The Communist (Коммунист) (1967); revision of Vasily Gubanov
 Red Cossacks (Красные казаки) (1971)
 The Baby Stork (Аистенок), Children's Opera (1934)

Ballet
 The Baby Stork (Аистенок) (1936)
 Svetlana (Светлана) (1939)

Musical comedy
 The Amur Guest (Амурский гость) (1938)
 To Your Health (За ваше здоровье) (1941)
 My Guard (Мой гвардеец) (1942)
 My Boy (Мой мальчик) (1947)

Orchestral
 На западе бой, Poem for orchestra (1931)
 Ukrainian Concertino (Украинское концертино) (1940)
 Symphony No.1 In Memoriam to the Martyrs of Babi Yar (1945)
 Ukrainian Suite (Украинская сюита) (1949)
 Symphony No.2 (1952)
 Symphony No.3 (1956)
 Symphony No.4 (1958)
 Symphony No.5 (1959)
 Suite No.1 for chamber orchestra (1971)
 Four Preludes and Fugues (Четыре прелюдии и фуги) (1975)
 Heroic poem, dedicated to the 30th anniversary of Victory in the Great Patriotic War (Героическая поэма, посвященная 30-летию победы в Великой Отечественной войне) (1975)
 Suite No.2 for chamber orchestra (1976)
 Symphony No.6 (1981)
 Symphony No.7 (1982)
 Symphony No.8 "Poeme about bread" for soprano, bass and orchestra (1983)
 Symphony No.9 (1989)

Concertante
 Concerto No.1 for violin and orchestra (1939)
 Poem-Fantasia on a Theme of Nishchinsky (Поэма-фантазия на тему Нищинского) for cello and orchestra (1950)
 Concerto No.1 for cello and orchestra (1950)
 Concerto No.2 for violin and orchestra (1951)
 Concerto for dombra and orchestra (1956)
 Concerto for flute, harp, string orchestra and percussion (1974)
 Concerto No.2 for cello and orchestra (1977)
 Concerto for viola and string orchestra (1983)
 Japanese Silhouettes for viola d'amore, soprano and ensemble (1987)

Chamber music
 String Quartet No.1 (1925)
 Nocturne and Canzonetta (Ноктюрн и канцонетта) for violin and piano (1926)
 String Quartet No.2 (1926)
 Piano Trio No. 1 (1927)
 String Quartet No.3 (1933)
 Song (Песня) for violin and piano (1943)
 String Quartet No.4 (1946)
 String Quintet (1953)
 Wind Quintet (1957)
 Melody and Waltz (Мелодия и вальс) for violin and piano (1958)
 Piano Trio No. 2 (1958)
 Piano Quintet (1962)
 String Quartet No.5 (1966)
 String Quartet No.6 (1968)

Piano
 Four Pieces (4 пьесы) (1957)

Film score
 Secrets of Counter-Espionage or Secret Agent (Подвиг разведчика), fiction, 92 minutes (1947)

External links 
 
 Dmitri Klebanov classical.net

1907 births
1987 deaths
Musicians from Kharkiv
People from Kharkovsky Uyezd
Soviet Jews
Jewish classical composers
Ukrainian opera composers
Soviet opera composers
Jewish opera composers
Soviet classical pianists
Soviet composers
Soviet male composers
Male classical composers
Male classical pianists
20th-century classical pianists
20th-century male musicians
20th-century classical composers
Ukrainian classical composers